My Big Big Friend (pt: Meu Amigãozão) is a Flash animated children's television series created by Andrés Lieban and Claudia Koogan Breitman, co-produced by Brazilian studio 2D Lab and the Canadian company Breakthrough Animation.

It had its first showing on August 9, 2009 on Discovery Kids Latin America and on May 9, 2010 on TV Brazil. It also premiered in Canada on Treehouse TV on August 9, 2010. It was financed with the laws of federal tax incentives, the Procult (BNDES) and the Audiovisual Sector Fund – FSA.

The show centers around the friendships of three children, Yuri, Lili and Matt, each of whom has a "Big Big Friend" who is invisible to adults and other children but seen by all three friends.

The show is flash-animated with Toon Boom Harmony.

Characters

Main
Yuri – Yuri is 5 years old. He is smart, independent and happy, and has a very fertile imagination. He is an only child, and as a result is sometimes lonely, and can be a little selfish.
Lili – Lili is almost 6 years old, very determined and loyal, and often speaks before she thinks. She is the oldest of four children, and often tries to help take care of her three baby brothers; this has given her a tendency towards bossiness, which her friends do not always like, especially when she tries to take control of their games.
Matt – Matt is 7 years old, loves to play sports, and is very energetic in everything he does. He is very curious, full of ideas and opinions, and very mischievous, which means he is often getting into trouble. He has an older sister named Nina who often teases him.

Big Big Friends
Golias – Golias, Yuri's Big Big Friend, is a large, round, blue elephant. Golias is affectionate, likes to act, dress up, try new things and play outdoors. He is also very timid, and gnashes his teeth in fear if the lights are out. He loves to give Yuri trunk rides, and is quite sad if he ever feels left out. In Spanish, he is called Goliat.
Nessa – Nessa is Lili's Big Big Friend. She is a pink giraffe who can make friends with anyone, and is optimistic and cheerful. Nessa also lets Lili ride on her neck. She is agreeable and mediates conflicts.
Bongo – Matt's Big Big Friend is named Bongo; he is a green kangaroo. Like Matt, he is athletic, energetic and constantly jumping.  He has a great sense of humor and an infectious, uncontrollable laugh.  Bongo is afraid of being ignored and likes attention. Bongo is also very fearful. He has a pouch that Matt rides in despite the fact he is a male kangaroo (in real life, only female kangaroos have pouches). His pouch is apparently in more than one spot, since Bongo can be seen pulling things out or putting things into different pouches in various locations, such as, up by his neck, down at his sides (almost like pockets).

Cast

Canada
 Yuri – Nissae Isen
 Matt – Gage Munroe
 Lili – Addison Holley
 Golias – Scott McCord
 Bongo – Rick Miller
 Nessa – Tajja Isen
 Lobster (Beach Blast!) - Stacey DePass
 Rose (Flower Power!) - Catherine Disher
 Daisy (Flower Power!) - Stephanie Anne Mills
 Pansy (Flower Power!) - Hannah Endicott-Douglas
 Yuri's Dad - Neil Crone
 Yuri's Mom / Bushy the Dog - Susan Roman
 Lili's Mom - Linda Ballantyne
 Lili's Dad - Martin Roach
 Matt's Mom / Otto the Penguin - Julie Lemieux
 Matt's Dad - Richard Waugh
 Oyster (Beach Blast!) / S Magnet (Everyone's A Critic) - Sean Cullen
 Ms. Carrol - Julie Pinto
 Ms. Martin - Athena Karkanis
 Grandmother - Corinne Conley
 Mother Hen - Ellen-Ray Hennessey
 Lisa - Alyson Court
 Soccer Ball - Bruce Dow

Brazil
 Yuri – Fernanda Ribeiro
 Matt – Eduardo Drummond (Season 1) and João Victor Granja (Season 2)
 Lili – Anna Rita Cerqueira
 Golias – Márcio Simões
 Bongo – Sérgio Stern
 Nessa – Lina Mendes (Season 1) and Christiane Monteiro (Season 2)

Episodes

Series overview

Season 1 (2009-2011)

Season 1 premiered in Canada on August 9, 2010 and in Brazil on September 9, 2009.

Season 2 (2012–2014)

Interstitials 
s2e2 Ice Cream  11 December 2014
s2e8 Princess 12 December 2014
s2e5 Finding You 18 December 2014
s2e21 Golf Partners 30 May 2015
s2e24 That Way 27 December 2016

References

External links

 Meu Amigãozão site oficial
 Meu Amigãozão no discoverykidsbrasil.com
 
 My Big Big Friend at the Big Cartoon Database

2010s Brazilian television series
2010s Brazilian animated television series
2010 Brazilian television series debuts
2014 Brazilian television series endings
2010s Canadian children's television series
2010s Canadian animated comedy television series
2010 Canadian television series debuts
2014 Canadian television series endings
2010s preschool education television series
Brazilian flash animated television series
Brazilian children's animated adventure television series
Brazilian children's animated comedy television series
Brazilian children's animated fantasy television series
Canadian flash animated television series
Canadian children's animated adventure television series
Canadian children's animated comedy television series
Canadian children's animated fantasy television series
Canadian preschool education television series
Animated preschool education television series
Early childhood education
English-language television shows
Portuguese-language television shows
Discovery Kids original programming
Treehouse TV original programming
Animated television series about children
Animated television series about elephants
Fictional giraffes
Television series about kangaroos and wallabies
Anthropomorphic animals
Works about friendship
Television series by Corus Entertainment